Irakli Kobalia (born 13 March 1992) is a Georgian association football player, who plays as a striker for Guria Lanchkhuti in the Umaglesi Liga.

Career
Kobalia started his career with Baia, before transferring to Rustavi in 2011. He was a starter in Rustavi's first 2011–12 UEFA Europa League qualifying phase and play-off round against Armenian club Banants F.C. in which Rustavi won the opening leg 1–0, with Kobalia scoring the only goal in the 48th minute.

References

External links
 UEFA Profile
 

Footballers from Georgia (country)
1992 births
Living people
FC Zugdidi players
FC Metalurgi Rustavi players
FC Zestafoni players
FC Kolkheti Khobi players
Association football forwards
Georgia (country) international footballers
Georgia (country) under-21 international footballers